The United States diplomatic mission to the Netherlands consists of the embassy located in The Hague and a consular office located in Amsterdam.

In 1782, John Adams was appointed America's first Minister Plenipotentiary to Holland. According to the United States Department of State, the  same year came formal recognition by the Netherlands of the United States as a separate and independent nation, along with badly needed financial help that indicated faith in its future. These loans from the United Provinces, which have been called "the Marshall Plan in reverse," were the first the new government received. Adams purchased a home in the Hague at Fluwelen Burgwal 18 (located within Uilebomen, The Hague Center), as the first US embassy.

The current American Embassy building in The Hague opened on January 29, 2018. Notable Americans such as former Presidents Adams and John Quincy Adams, General Hugh Ewing and Iraq Envoy L. Paul Bremer have held the title of Ambassador.

Besides the embassy, a U.S. consulate-general is located on Curaçao which is responsible for the territory of the Kingdom of the Netherlands in the Caribbean. This consulate is not part of the U.S. diplomatic mission to the Netherlands.

April 19, the day John Adams presented his credentials in the Hague, was declared by President Ronald Reagan to be memorialized as "Dutch-American Friendship Day".

Ambassadors

See also

Ambassadors of the United States
Foreign relations of the Netherlands
Netherlands–United States relations

References

United States Department of State: Background notes on the Netherlands

External links
 United States Department of State: Chiefs of Mission for the Netherlands
 United States Department of State: Netherlands
 United States Embassy and Consulate in the Netherlands

Netherlands
 
United States Ambassadors to the Netherlands